Kieren Jack (born 28 June 1987) is a former Australian rules footballer who played for the Sydney Swans in the Australian Football League (AFL). He was the co-captain of the Sydney Swans, alongside Jarrad McVeigh from 2013 to 2016.

Early life
Jack was born in Sydney, New South Wales. The son of former Balmain, NSW and Australian rugby league player Garry Jack, Kieren is the eldest of three brothers raised in the Cherrybrook suburb of Sydney. His younger brothers are Rhys and Brandon.

Kieren was educated at West Pennant Hills Primary School where he played in its AFL team, including the premiership side in 1999. He attended high school at Oakhill College in Castle Hill, New South Wales.

His first experience of Australian rules was in the Paul Kelly Cup in 1998 in primary school playing for the junior Pennant Hills Demons AFC. He went on to play a key part in premierships with the junior Demons in 1999 and 2000. He played both rugby league (Carlingford Cougars) and Australian rules until 2000 before breaking the news to his father that he wanted to stop playing league to focus on Australian Rules. He was identified by AFL talent scouts and taken by Sydney in the 2005 Rookie Draft from the NSW/ACT Rams Under 18 team.

AFL career
Before even making his debut, Kieren made news in 2007 as one of four players allegedly involved in an AFL betting scandal, though many criticised the AFL's decision to identify him as his was only a $5 bet. He was later promoted from the rookie list. Notable for his tackling and running abilities, he plays as a midfielder for the Swans. In round four, 2008, he gained a NAB AFL Rising Star nomination for his role on West Coast Eagles onballer Daniel Kerr in a match the Swans won by 62 points (their biggest win over the Eagles since 2000).

In 2009, he featured in the official advertisement for the AFL, contesting the Australian football against Leon Davis along the floor of on an ice hockey rink.  His career year was capped off with taking home the Bob Skilton Medal as the Swans' best and fairest player over Shane Mumford and Josh Kennedy. After a breakthrough season in 2010, Jack struggle through much of 2011 with an ankle injury. He missed 6 games due to injury and was for the most part unable to recapture his form and impact from 2010. He played his 100th AFL game for the Sydney Swans against  in Round 11, 2012. He finished 4th in the 2012 Bob Skilton Medal a week after kicking 2 crucial goals in the Swans' Grand Final victory at the MCG over the Hawthorn Hawks.

In 2013, Jack was named co-captain of the Sydney Swans, alongside 2012 Premiership Captain, Jarrad McVeigh. This decision was made after previous co-captain Adam Goodes announced he was stepping down from the position.

On 19 August 2019, Jack announced that he would retire at the end of the 2019 AFL season.

Along with Heath Grundy he holds the record for most senior games played by an ex-rookie at the Swans, 256.

Personal life
Kieren Jack is married to television journalist and presenter Charlotte Goodlet.

In July 2016, it was reported Jack had a falling out with his parents. It was reported that Jack did not invite his parents to his 200th AFL game. Former Swan and radio personality Ryan Fitzgerald criticised Garry Jack and his wife for airing the feud publicly on Twitter.

Statistics
 Statistics are correct to the end of the 2016 season

|- style="background-color: #EAEAEA"
! scope="row" style="text-align:center" | 2007
|style="text-align:center;"|
| 48 || 2 || 0 || 0 || 8 || 10 || 18 || 4 || 4 || 0.0 || 0.0 || 4.0 || 5.0 || 9.0 || 2.0 || 2.0
|- 
! scope="row" style="text-align:center" | 2008
|style="text-align:center;"|
| 15 || 23 || 11 || 9 || 171 || 113 || 284 || 69 || 91 || 0.5 || 0.4 || 7.4 || 4.9 || 12.3 || 3.0 || 4.0
|- style="background:#eaeaea;"
! scope="row" style="text-align:center" | 2009
|style="text-align:center;"|
| 15 || 22 || 13 || 10 || 174 || 149 || 323 || 55 || 85 || 0.6 || 0.5 || 7.9 || 6.8 || 14.7 || 2.5 || 3.9
|- 
! scope="row" style="text-align:center" | 2010
|style="text-align:center;"|
| 15 || 24 || 21 || 15 || 307 || 181 || 488 || 68 || 147 || 0.9 || 0.6 || 12.8 || 7.5 || 20.3 || 2.8 || 6.1
|- style="background:#eaeaea;"
! scope="row" style="text-align:center" | 2011
|style="text-align:center;"|
| 15 || 18 || 6 || 7 || 228 || 115 || 343 || 36 || 96 || 0.3 || 0.4 || 12.7 || 6.4 || 19.1 || 2.0 || 5.3
|- 
! scope="row" style="text-align:center" | 2012
|style="text-align:center;"|
| 15 || 25 || 27 || 13 || 359 || 242 || 601 || 65 || 140 || 1.1 || 0.5 || 14.4 || 9.7 || 24.0 || 2.6 || 5.6
|- style="background:#eaeaea;"
! scope="row" style="text-align:center" | 2013
|style="text-align:center;"|
| 15 || 25 || 24 || 14 || 350 || 281 || 631 || 53 || 159 || 1.0 || 0.6 || 14.0 || 11.2 || 25.2 || 2.1 || 6.4
|- 
! scope="row" style="text-align:center" | 2014
|style="text-align:center;"|
| 15 || 24 || 18 || 13 || 323 || 249 || 572 || 82 || 131 || 0.8 || 0.6 || 13.5 || 10.4 || 23.9 || 3.4 || 5.5
|- style="background:#eaeaea;"
! scope="row" style="text-align:center" | 2015
|style="text-align:center;"|
| 15 || 22 || 11 || 7 || 243 || 265 || 508 || 87 || 132 || 0.5 || 0.3 || 11.0 || 12.0 || 23.1 || 4.0 || 6.0
|- 
! scope="row" style="text-align:center" | 2016
|style="text-align:center;"|
| 15 || 25 || 13 || 13 || 310 || 254 || 564 || 83 || 145 || 0.5 || 0.5 || 12.4 || 10.2 || 22.6 || 3.3 || 5.8
|- class="sortbottom"
! colspan=3| Career
! 210
! 144
! 101
! 2473
! 1859
! 4332
! 602
! 1130
! 0.7
! 0.5
! 11.8
! 8.9
! 20.6
! 2.9
! 5.4
|}

References

External links

 
 

Australian rules footballers from New South Wales
Sydney Swans players
Sydney Swans Premiership players
1987 births
Living people
Bob Skilton Medal winners
All-Australians (AFL)
Pennant Hills Australian Football Club players
Australia international rules football team players
One-time VFL/AFL Premiership players
People educated at Oakhill College